The Women's 4 × 200 metre freestyle relay competition at the 2017 World Championships was held on 27 July 2017.

Records
Prior to the competition, the existing world and championship records were as follows.

Results

Heats
The heats were held at 10:48.

Final
The final was held at 19:16.

References

Women's 4 x 200 metre freestyle relay
2017 in women's swimming